Mase (born 1975) is an American rapper.

Mase or Masé may also refer to:

People
 Chigaya Mase (間瀬ちがや?, b. 1967), Japanese ski mountaineer
, Japanese footballer and manager
, Japanese footballer
 Dana Mase, American pop singer and songwriter
 Marino Masé (b. 1939), Italian film actor
 Vincent Mason (b. 1970), American rapper, producer, DJ

Other uses
 Mase, Switzerland, former municipality in the district of Hérens in the canton of Valais in Switzerland
 Mean absolute scaled error (MASE), a measure of accuracy of forecasts

See also
Mace (disambiguation)
Maze (disambiguation)

Japanese-language surnames